The Kuskokwim Mountains is a range of mountains in the Yukon-Koyukuk Census Area, Alaska, United States, west of the Alaska Range and southeast of the Yukon River. The Kuskokwim Mountains begin in the interior west of Fairbanks.

The southeast flank of the Kuskokwim Mountains borders the rivers Kantishna, Kuskokwim, Holitna and Kogrukluk.  In the northwest lie the Kaiyuh, Russian and Kilbuck Mountains as well as the rivers Innoko, Dishna and Iditarod.

The range takes its name from the Kuskokwim River, which flows through the mountains, as well as Aniak and Nowitna rivers.

Reported and defined in 1898 by Josiah Edward Spurr of the USGS.  Spurr applied the name "Tanana Hills" to the low mountains at the northeast end of what are now the Kuskokwim Mountains.

Sub-ranges 

 Ahklun Mountains
 Eek Mountains
 Wood River Mountains
 Russian Mountains
 Kilbuck Mountains

References

External links 
 

Landforms of Bethel Census Area, Alaska
Landforms of Dillingham Census Area, Alaska
Landforms of Yukon–Koyukuk Census Area, Alaska
Mountain ranges of Alaska
Mountains of Unorganized Borough, Alaska